Memphis Facula  is a palimpsest, or "ghost crater", on Ganymede, the largest of the Jovian satellites.

About 360 km across, it is situated in the southwestern part of Galileo Regio, a huge almost circular dark region in Ganymede's northern hemisphere. Although almost level today, it is a relic of a massive impact and once was a deep impact crater whose walls have slumped and its floor has risen isostatically, smoothing out the remaining topography with slush.

The morphology of the larger palimpsests like Memphis Facula suggests that Ganymede's icy crust at the time of impact was about 10 km thick and was penetrated by the impact, allowing the slush and fluid beneath to fill and level out the crater.

See also 
Ganymede City

References 

Surface features of Ganymede (moon)